"Hustle!!! (Dead on It)" is a song written and recorded by James Brown. Released as a single in 1975, the song charted #11 R&B. "Hustle" was the lead track on his album Everybody's Doin' the Hustle & Dead on the Double Bump. The song's title refers to the popular dance the Hustle.

References

James Brown songs
Songs written by James Brown
1975 singles
1975 songs
Polydor Records singles